Harry Gabb CVO (1909 – 1995) was an English  organist, who served at Llandaff Cathedral, St Paul's Cathedral and the Chapel Royal.

Background
(William) Harry Gabb was born in Ilford, Essex on 5 April 1909.

He studied organ at the Royal College of Music where he won the George Carter Organ Scholarship.

He was awarded the MVO in 1961 and the CVO in 1974. He was a Special Commissioner for the Royal School of Church Music, and as a Council Member of the Royal College of Organists. on 16 May 1974 he was awarded a Lambeth Doctor of Music by the Archbishop of Canterbury

He died on 16 March 1995 at the age of 85.

Family
He married Helen Mutton in 1937. They had one son.

Career
Sub organist of:
Exeter Cathedral 1929 - 1937
St Paul's Cathedral 1946 - 1974

Organist of:
St Jude's Church, West Norwood 1925 - 1928
Christ Church, Gipsy Hill 1928 - 1929
St Leonard's Church, Exeter and St. Michael and All Angels, Heavitree 1929 - 1937
Llandaff Cathedral 1937 - 1946
Chapel Royal 1953 - 1974
St. Lawrence's Church, Chobham 1974 onwards

He was Professor and Examiner of Organ Playing at Trinity College of Music 1946 - 1988.

References

1909 births
1995 deaths
English classical organists
British male organists
Cathedral organists
Commanders of the Royal Victorian Order
People from Ilford
Alumni of the Royal College of Music
20th-century classical musicians
20th-century English musicians
20th-century organists
20th-century British male musicians
Male classical organists